Riesa-Großenhain was a district in Saxony, Germany. It was bounded by (from the north and clockwise) the districts of 
Elbe-Elster and Oberspreewald-Lausitz in Brandenburg, Kamenz, Meißen, Döbeln and Torgau-Oschatz.

History 
The district was created in 1994 by merging the two previous districts Riesa and Großenhain. In August 2008, it was incorporated into the district of Meißen.

Geography 
The district is situated in the plain countryside north of the virtual line connecting Leipzig and Dresden. The main river is the Elbe which runs through the district from south to northwest.

Coat of arms

Towns and municipalities

External links